A colony is a territory governed by people from another country.

Colony may also refer to:

Biology
Colony (biology), group of individual organisms of the same species living closely together

Places in the United States
Colony, Alabama
Colony, Kansas
Colony, Missouri
Colony, Oklahoma
Colony, Lexington, a neighborhood in southwestern Lexington, Kentucky
The Colony, Texas
Colony Township, Adams County, Iowa
Colony Township, Delaware County, Iowa
Colony Township, Greeley County, Kansas
Colony Township, Knox County, Missouri

Arts, entertainment, and media

Film
Colony (film), a 2010 documentary about beekeepers and colony collapse disorder
The Colony (1995 film), an American made-for-television thriller starring John Ritter
The Colony (1996 film), an American made-for-television thriller starring Michael Paré
The Colony (2007 film), a Canadian short film by Jeff Barnaby
The Colony (2013 film), a Canadian science fiction horror film starring Laurence Fishburne
The Colony (2015 film) or Colonia, a drama starring Emma Watson and Daniel Brühl
A Colony, a 2018 Canadian French-language film starring Émilie Bierre
The Colony (also known as Tides, a 2021 German-Swiss science fiction thriller film

Literature
Colony (Buffy novel), based on the Buffy the Vampire Slayer television series
Colony (Grant novel), by Rob Grant
"Colony" (short story), by Philip K. Dick
The Colony (novel), novel by Audrey Magee

Music
Colony (In Flames album), 1999
"Colony", a song by Joy Division on the album Closer
"Colony", a song by Susumu Hirasawa on the 1995 album Sim City

Television
Colony (TV series), a 2016 American television series on USA Network
The Colony (2005 TV series), 2005 reality television series set in historical Australia
The Colony (American TV series), 2009 Discovery Channel reality television series set in a post-apocalyptic US
"Colony" (The X-Files), episode from the television series The X-Files
"The Colony", an episode from the television series Voltron: Legendary Defender

Video games
Colony (video game), 1987 computer game by Mastertronic
The Colony (video game), 1988 computer game by Mindscape

Brands and enterprises
Colony (restaurant), London, England
Colony Brands, an American mail-order and electronic retail company
The Colony (restaurant), New York City (1923–1971)
The Colony Room Club, a club in London (1948-2008)

Other uses
a body of people who have gathered to live near each other, e.g. an artists' colony
Colony (fraternity or sorority), a probationary chapter of a national fraternity or sorority
Colony (Poland), a type of settlement in Poland
Colony (Russian Empire), a type of settlement in the Russian Empire with an invited foreign population
Colony Club, a social club in New York City, New York, USA
Colony Framework, an open source plugin framework specification
Colony High School, Ontario, California
Colony houses, model housing developments in Edinburgh
Colony-class frigate, a US Navy class
The Colony (Bennachie), a former squatters' community near Aberdeen, Scotland
The Colony (professional wrestling), professional wrestling stable in Chikara
Jim Colony, sports news announcer

See also

Colony House (disambiguation)
Colonia (disambiguation)
Colonie (disambiguation)